The Trichinopoly Group is a geological formation in India whose strata date back to the Late Cretaceous. It lies between the Ootatoor and Ariyalur Groups. It is broad in its southern extremity but thins as it gradually proceeds northwards as it ultimately meets the Ariyalur Group. Dinosaur remains are among the fossils that have been recovered from the formation.

Vertebrate paleofauna 
 Dravidosaurus blanfordi - "Fragmentary skeleton with partial skull, adult."

See also 
 List of dinosaur-bearing rock formations

References

Bibliography 
  

Geologic groups of Asia
Geologic formations of India
Upper Cretaceous Series of Asia
Coniacian Stage
Santonian Stage
Turonian Stage
Sandstone formations
Shallow marine deposits
Paleontology in India